Owen Paulsen is a New Zealand jurist, who served as Chief Justice of Tonga from 2015 to 2019. Since August 2019 he has been an associate justice of the High Court of New Zealand.

Paulsen was educated at Shirley Boys' High School and the University of Canterbury, and later at the University of Auckland. He worked as a solicitor and later a partner for Harman & Co, and then as a member of the Employment Tribunal. He later worked for the law firm Cavell Leitch.

In January 2015 he was appointed Chief Justice of Tonga, replacing Michael Dishington Scott. As Chief Justice he quashed the sacking of Tonga Broadcasting Commission directors 'Eseta Fusitu'a and Tunakaimanu Fielakepa, and oversaw the corruption trial of government minister ʻEtuate Lavulavu. He also oversaw the TONGASAT case, which found that US$50 million paid to Tongasat by the government of China was invalid and unlawful.

In July 2019 he resigned as Chief Justice after being appointed as an associate justice of the High Court of New Zealand. He was replaced as Chief Justice by Michael Hargreaves Whitten.

References

Living people
People educated at Shirley Boys' High School
University of Canterbury alumni
University of Auckland alumni
New Zealand lawyers
High Court of New Zealand judges
Chief justices of Tonga
Year of birth missing (living people)